Rhythm & Drums is the first studio album by German dance duo Cosmic Gate. It was released on February 19, 2001 in Germany. The song "Somewhere Over the Rainbow" appeared in the video game DDRMAX Dance Dance Revolution 6thMix.

Track listing
"Open the Gate" (feat. Natascha Niemann) – 2:54 
"Exploration of Space" [Extended Mix] (feat. Thomas Friebe) – 8:15 
"Fire Wire" [Club Mix] – 8:13
"The Drums" [Video Mix] (feat. Natascha Niemann) – 3:36
"Melt to the Ocean" [Midnight Remix] - 7:57
"Lost In Music" – 3:44
"Somewhere Over the Rainbow" [Video Mix] – 3:42
"The Rhythm" – 7:53
"Wicked" – 7:13
"Mental Atmosphere" [Video Mix] (feat. Natascha Niemann) – 3:07 
"Running (Out of Time)" (feat. Thomas Friebe) – 6:43 
"Fire Wire" [DJ Scot Project Remix] – 9:56

Charts

References

External links
 
 Rhythm & Drums at Amazon.com

Cosmic Gate albums
2001 debut albums